Per Knut Aaland (born 5 September 1954 in Norway) is a retired Norwegian cross-country skier.

He was born in Randabygda, lived in Hornindal and represented the sports club Hardbagg IL. He won a silver medal in the 4 × 10 km relay at the 1980 Olympic Games in Lake Placid, New York. He also finished sixth in the 50 km race at the 1976 Olympic Games and sixteenth in the 30 km race at the 1980 Olympic Games. His best career finish was second in three World Cup events.

Despite retiring in 1987, Aaland continued his involvement with the Norwegian national skiing team into the 1990s as a waxing expert.

Cross-country skiing results
All results are sourced from the International Ski Federation (FIS).

Olympic Games
 1 medal – (1 silver)

World Championships

World Cup

Season standings

Individual podiums
 3 podiums

References 

1954 births
Living people
People from Stryn
Norwegian male cross-country skiers
Cross-country skiers at the 1976 Winter Olympics
Cross-country skiers at the 1980 Winter Olympics
Olympic cross-country skiers of Norway
Olympic silver medalists for Norway
Olympic medalists in cross-country skiing
Medalists at the 1980 Winter Olympics
Sportspeople from Vestland